São Francisco is a municipality in the state of São Paulo in Brazil. The population is 2,817 (2020 est.) in an area of 75.6 km². The elevation is 402 m.

References

Municipalities in São Paulo (state)